Cethosia hypsea, the Malay lacewing, is a butterfly of the family Nymphalidae. It is found in from Burma to Indonesia and the Philippines.

The wingspan is about 80 mm. Adults are bright orange red above with broad black borders, warning predators of their toxicity. The underside is orange red with white fasciae and is spotted with black. The wings are scalloped.

The larvae feed on Adenia species. They are wine red and have long spines. They are also poisonous.

Subspecies
C. h. hypsea (Borneo)
C. h. palawana Fruhstorfer (Palawan)
C. h. munjava Fruhstorfer (western Java)
C. h. fruhstorferi Stichel (eastern Java)
C. h. hypsina C. & R. Felder, [1867] (southern Burma to Singapore)
C. h. aeole Moore (north-eastern Sumatra)
C. h. triocala Fruhstorfer (western Sumatra)
C. h. pallaurea Hagen, 1898 (Mentawai)
C. h. bankana Fruhstorfer (Bangka Island)
C. h. batuensis Stichel (Batu Islands)
C. h. mindanensis Felder (Philippines (Mindanao, Basilan))
C. h. festiva Fruhstorfer, 1909 (Jolo (Sulu Archipelago))
C. h. elioti Okubo, 1983

References

Acraeini
Butterflies of Singapore
Butterflies of Indochina
Butterflies of Borneo
Butterflies described in 1847